Carlo Fatuzzo (born 14 March 1944 in Genoa) is an Italian politician, leader of the Pensioners' Party.

His daughter Elisabetta, a lawyer, is also an exponent of the Pensioners' Party.

Biography 
In 1979 Fatuzzo founded the Christian Party of Social Action, that ran in the 1979 and 1983 italian general elections, limitedly in the Brescia-Bergamo constituency for the Chamber and in the Lombardy constituency for the Senate. After the poor election results obtained, Fatuzzo dissolved the party.

In the 1987 general election he was candidate for the Chamber among the ranks of the Venetian League (without being elected), while on 19 October 1987 he founded the Pensioners' Party.

Subsequently he was elected municipal  and provincial councillor of Bergamo and regional councillor of Lombardy.

In the 1996 general election he was candidate for the Chamber in the  constituency of Albino, with the support of the Pole for Freedoms, but he was not elected.

Fatuzzo he was elected MEP in the european election of 1999, and he was re-confirmed also in the 2004 election; he sat in the European People's Party–European Democrats group.

In the 2018 general election he has been elected MP among the ranks of Forza Italia.

Political career
 since 1987: National Secretary of the Pensioners' Party
 Member of Bergamo City (1985-1990) and Provincial (1990-1995) Councils
 1990-1995: Member of Lombardy Regional Council
 2002-2004: Secretary of the European Association of Parties for the Protection of the Elderly
 1999-2009: Member of the European Parliament
 since 2018: Member of the Chamber of Deputies (Italy)

References

External links
 
 

1944 births
Living people
Politicians from Genoa
Pensioners' Party (Italy) MEPs
MEPs for Italy 2004–2009
MEPs for Italy 1999–2004
Deputies of Legislature XVIII of Italy